Romania joined North Atlantic Treaty Organization (NATO) on March 29, 2004, following the decision taken at the Prague Summit, in November 2002. For Romania, this has represented a major evolution, with decisive influence upon the foreign and domestic policy of Romania. NATO membership represents the guarantee of security and external stability, which is vital for ensuring the prosperous development of the country. Romania is playing an active role in promoting the values and objectives of the Alliance, by both participating in the operations and missions of the Alliance and involving in its conceptual initiatives and evolutions.

Military relations and peacekeeping missions

Romania was a partner to the allied forces during the Gulf War, particularly during its service as president of the UN Security Council. Romania has been active in peacekeeping operations in UNAVEM in Angola, IFOR/SFOR in Bosnia, in Albania, in Afghanistan and sent 860 troops in Iraq after the invasion led by the United States.

Romania enforced United Nations' sanctions against Yugoslavia. Despite divisions within the Parliament and among the people, Romania supported NATO in the Kosovo campaign and granted approval for NATO to overfly Romanian airspace. It was the first country to enroll in NATO's Partnership for Peace program, later joining NATO in 2004.

Romania also is a member of the Organization for Security and Cooperation in Europe (OSCE) and the North Atlantic Cooperation Council (NACC).

In August 2014, Romanian President Traian Băsescu called on NATO countries to send arms to the Ukrainian army.

Romania contains one of the weakest strategic points of NATO, the Focșani Gate. This is an area poorly linked to the rest of Europe, from which other regions of Romania and Europe can be attacked.

See also 
 Foreign relations of Romania 
 Foreign relations of NATO

References

Foreign relations of Romania
NATO relations